Kamjong (Meitei pronunciation: /kām-jōng/) is the headquarter of Kamjong district, Manipur state, India. The village is about  120 kilometers from Imphal  and is connected by Ukhrul-Kamjong State highway. This District headquarter is flanked by Langli in the north, Bungpa in the south, the Phange in the east and Dangthi in the west.

Total population 
According to 2011 census, Kamjong has 121 households with the total of 729 people of which 383 are male and 346 are female. Of the total population, 112 were in the age group of 0–6 years. The average sex ratio of the village is 903 female to 1000 male which is lower than the state average of 985. The literacy rate of the village stands at 71.96% which is lower than the state average 76.94%. Male literacy rate stands at 76.47% while female literacy rate was 67.01%.

People and occupation
The village is home to people of Tangkhul Naga tribe. Majority of the inhabitants are Christians. Agriculture is the primary occupation of the inhabitants.  Due to the porous international border with Myanmar Kamjong area most often is in the news for militancy activities. Kamjong area is also well known in the district for the poor transport system due to bad road condition and the inhabitants suffer most during the rainy season because of frequent landslides.

See also 

 Sorde village

Notes

References 

Cities and towns in Kamjong district